Rushden railway station is a railway station that once served the town of Rushden in Northamptonshire, England. It is now a heritage station at the end of a short running line.

History
The station was an intermediate stop on the Higham Ferrers branch line, originally established by the Midland Railway. It closed completely in 1969, British Rail having withdrawn passenger services ten years previously.

In 1996 the station was bought by the Rushden Historical Transport Society. Since then the station has been restored, and forms the headquarters of the society and includes the Rushden Station Railway Museum. The heritage railway now operates as the Rushden, Higham & Wellingborough Railway.

Stationmasters
Henry Pitt 1893 - 1914 (formerly station master at Finedon, afterwards station master at Cheltenham)
John Charles Gregory 1914 - 1929 (formerly station master at Hitchin)
C.V. Bunker from 1936 (formerly station master at Pye Bridge)

See also 
 List of closed railway stations in Britain
 Rushden, Higham and Wellingborough Railway
 Rushden Parkway railway station

References

Heritage railway stations in Northamptonshire
Railway stations in Great Britain closed in 1969
Rushden
Former Midland Railway stations
Railway stations in Great Britain opened in 1894